Hyacinthe Roosen (12 May 1897 – 11 February 1967) was a Belgian wrestler. He competed at the 1920, 1924 and the 1928 Summer Olympics.

References

External links
 

1897 births
1967 deaths
Olympic wrestlers of Belgium
Wrestlers at the 1920 Summer Olympics
Wrestlers at the 1924 Summer Olympics
Wrestlers at the 1928 Summer Olympics
Belgian male sport wrestlers
Place of birth missing